The Australian Outback Spectacular is an Australiana dinner and show package featuring many Australian animals, songs and bush tucker. The show is located between Warner Bros. Movie World and Wet'n'Wild Water World at Oxenford on the Gold Coast.

See also

Village Roadshow Theme Parks

References

External links

Village Roadshow Theme Parks
Tourist attractions on the Gold Coast, Queensland
Dinner theatre
Australian-themed retailers
Theme restaurants
Restaurants in Queensland
Horse showing and exhibition
Australian outback